Joseph William Wilhoit (December 20, 1885 – September 25, 1930) was an outfielder in Major League Baseball, playing mainly as a right fielder from  through  for the Boston Braves (1916–1917), Pittsburgh Pirates (1917), New York Giants (1917–1918), and Boston Red Sox (1919). A native of Hiawatha, Kansas, he attended DePaul University.

In a four-season career, Wilhoit was a .257 hitter (201-for-782) with three home runs and 73 RBI in 283 games, including 93 runs, 23 doubles, nine triples, 28 stolen bases, and a .323 on-base percentage. He also appeared in Games 2 and 6 of the 1917 World Series as a pinch-hitter and went 0-for-1 with a walk. 
 
Wilhoit died at the age of 44 in Santa Barbara, California.

He was married to Zulekiah Katherine Hicks, who worked as the personal secretary to one of the top Generals during World War I at the Department of War. After the war, they moved around the country following Joe's baseball career, eventually settling in Santa Barbara. They opened up a luggage store on State Street, called Wilhoit's Luggage.  It was later sold to Lindy Lindhorst, the top salesman at the store, who renamed it Lindy's.

Milestone
Wilhoit posted the longest hitting streak in baseball history with 69 games while playing for the Wichita Jobbers of the Western League. From June 14 to August 19, 1919, he went 153-for-297 for a .515 batting average to set the record streak. His hits included four home runs, nine triples and 24 doubles.

External links

Retrosheet
SABR Biography
The Baseball Research Journal

1885 births
1930 deaths
Major League Baseball right fielders
Boston Braves players
Pittsburgh Pirates players
New York Giants (NL) players
Boston Red Sox players
Venice Tigers players
Stockton Producers players
Victoria Bees players
Vernon Tigers players
Seattle Rainiers players
Wichita Jobbers players
Toledo Mud Hens players
Salt Lake City Bees players
Baseball players from Kansas
DePaul Blue Demons baseball players
People from Hiawatha, Kansas